Niklas Süle (born 3 September 1995) is a German professional footballer who plays as a centre-back for  club Borussia Dortmund and the Germany national team.

Club career

Early career 
Süle started his career with Rot-Weiß Walldorf. In July 2006, he signed for the youth team of Eintracht Frankfurt, where he played until the end of the 2008–09 season. In July 2009, he signed for the youth team of SV Darmstadt 98, and only half a year later he left for the youth team at 1899 Hoffenheim.

1899 Hoffenheim 

On 11 May 2013, Süle made his debut for Hoffenheim in a Bundesliga game against Hamburger SV. He started the match but was substituted for Andreas Ludwig in the 81st minute. Hoffenheim lost the game 4–1. During the 2012–13 season, Süle made two Bundesliga appearances and two relegation playoff appearances as Hoffenheim defeated 1. FC Kaiserslautern to stay in the Bundesliga.

During the 2013–14 season Süle established himself as an important first team player for Hoffenheim. Süle played in 25 Bundesliga matches and scored four goals as he helped Hoffenheim finish 9th in the league.

Süle started the 2014–15 season strong and played every minute during the first 14 Bundesliga matches. On 12 December 2014, Süle suffered a torn anterior cruciate ligament during matchday 15 against Frankfurt. Süle was sidelined for the rest of the season due to the injury. Hoffenheim finished 8th in the league.

Süle returned for the 2015–16 season after the ACL tear. He played every minute in 33 Bundesliga matches as Hoffenheim finished a disappointing 15th in the league.

Süle had a very impressive 2016–17 season for Hoffenheim as he played in 33 Bundesliga matches. Hoffenheim finished in an impressive 4th in the Bundesliga. Süle's performance drew interest from clubs like Bayern Munich and Chelsea.

On 15 January 2017, Bayern Munich had announced that they had signed Süle along with Sebastian Rudy from Hoffenheim as a double swoop. Both Süle and Rudy joined Bayern Munich on 1 July 2017.

Bayern Munich 

Süle's first appearance came as he was named a starter for Bayern Munich's season opener against Bayer 04 Leverkusen on 18 August 2017. He scored the first goal of the 2017–18 Bundesliga season, heading in a free kick from fellow Bayern newcomer and Hoffenheim-product Sebastian Rudy. On 12 September 2017, Süle made his Champions League debut against Anderlecht. Süle played in 27 Bundesliga matches and scored two goals. He made nine appearances in the Champions League during the season.

Süle won his first Bundesliga title after Bayern Munich finished 21 points ahead of second-placed Schalke 04. Süle also reached his first DFB-Pokal final as Bayern Munich were beaten 3–1 by Süle's former youth club, Eintracht Frankfurt.

Süle started the 2018–19 season by playing in the 2018 German Super Cup, which Bayern won 5–0. On 20 April 2019, Süle scored the winning goal in a 1–0 win over Werder Bremen. The win kept Bayern at the top of the Bundesliga table.

On 18 May 2019, Süle won his second Bundesliga title as Bayern finished with 78 points, two points above Dortmund. A week later, Süle won his first DFB-Pokal as Bayern defeated RB Leipzig 3–0 in the 2019 DFB-Pokal Final. He played in 31 Bundesliga matches and scored two goals. During the Bundesliga season, Süle had a 95 percent pass completion while having the fourth most touches of any Bundesliga player. Süle appeared in 42 matches in all competitions and scored two goals.

Süle tore his anterior cruciate ligament injury in the 12th minute of the team's eighth league match of the 2019-20 season and was expected to be out of the line-up for eight to ten months, preventing him from participating with Germany for UEFA Euro 2020, before the tournament was postponed. On 8 August 2020, Süle played against Chelsea in the Champions League, marking his first match since October 2019. He then started from the bench in the later games in the Champions League. On 23 August 2020, Süle came on from the bench in the 2020 UEFA Champions League Final and replaced Jérôme Boateng after he suffered an early injury. He won the Champions League, completing the continental treble for that season.

On 9 December 2020, Süle scored his first Champions League goal in a 2–0 win over Lokomotiv Moscow.

Borussia Dortmund 
Süle agreed to join Borussia Dortmund starting from the 2022–23 season on a free transfer on a four-year contract.

International career 
Süle participated in the 2012 UEFA European Under-17 Championship with the German U17 team.

He was part of the squad for the 2016 Summer Olympics, where Germany won the silver medal.

Süle was called up in August 2016 when the Germany national football team played Finland and Norway. He was brought off in the 59th minute against Finland.

Süle was named in Germany's final 23-man squad by Joachim Löw for the 2018 FIFA World Cup. On 27 June, Süle made his first World Cup appearance in the last match of the group stage in a 2–0 defeat to South Korea, as Germany got knocked out of the World Cup in the first round for the first time since 1938. On 19 May 2021, he was selected for the UEFA Euro 2020 squad.

Personal life 
Süle was born in Frankfurt, Hesse. His grandfather György emigrated with his wife from Budapest to Germany. His father Georg worked as a coach at Rot-Weiss Walldorf; meanwhile, his elder brother, Fabian, had a football scholarship at the St. Francis College in Brooklyn, New York, to study Business Management, Economics and Finance. His family name is of Hungarian origin, but the manager of the Turkish Football Federation under-16 national team contacted Süle during his teenage years about the possibility of playing for them as Süle's surname seemed Turkish to him. He was also eligible for the Hungarian national team, since he holds Hungarian citizenship.

Süle had a son in late 2020 with his girlfriend Melissa Halte.

Career statistics

Club

International 

As of match played 26 September 2022. Scores and results list Germany's goal tally first.

Honours 
Bayern Munich
 Bundesliga: 2017–18, 2018–19, 2019–20, 2020–21, 2021–22
 DFB-Pokal: 2018–19, 2019–20
 DFL-Supercup: 2017, 2018, 2020, 2021
 UEFA Champions League: 2019–20
 UEFA Super Cup: 2020
 FIFA Club World Cup: 2020

Germany Olympic
 Summer Olympic Games silver medal: 2016

Germany
 FIFA Confederations Cup: 2017

Individual
 UEFA Champions League Breakthrough XI: 2017
 Bundesliga Team of the Season: 2016–17

 kicker Bundesliga Team of the Season: 2021–22

References

External links 

 Profile at the Borussia Dortmund website
 

1995 births
Living people
Footballers from Frankfurt
German footballers
Association football defenders
TSG 1899 Hoffenheim II players
TSG 1899 Hoffenheim players
FC Bayern Munich footballers
Borussia Dortmund players
Regionalliga players
Bundesliga players
UEFA Champions League winning players
Germany youth international footballers
Germany under-21 international footballers
Germany international footballers
2017 FIFA Confederations Cup players
2018 FIFA World Cup players
UEFA Euro 2020 players
2022 FIFA World Cup players
FIFA Confederations Cup-winning players
Olympic footballers of Germany
Footballers at the 2016 Summer Olympics
Medalists at the 2016 Summer Olympics
Olympic silver medalists for Germany
Olympic medalists in football
German people of Hungarian descent